Garden of Evil is a 1954 American CinemaScope Western film directed by Henry Hathaway, about three somewhat disreputable 19th-century soldiers of fortune, played by Gary Cooper as an ex-lawman, Richard Widmark as a gambler, and Cameron Mitchell as a bounty hunter, who are randomly hired by a woman, portrayed by Susan Hayward, to rescue her husband (Hugh Marlowe). Rita Moreno appears at the beginning of the film as a Mexican cantina singer/dancer. It was the first outdoor picture photographed in the new CinemaScope anamorphic widescreen process and director Hathaway took special pains to use the stunning vistas of the Mexican locations to show off the new screen dimensions to best effect.

Plot
When their steamship for California experiences engine trouble, three American adventurers find themselves stranded in a Mexican fishing village. While they discuss their options in a local saloon, Leah Fuller, whose husband John is trapped in a distant gold mine, enters. She needs help to rescue him. Noticing the Americans, she offers them $2,000 each, tossing a bag of coins on their table. Her gesture attracts the attention of another saloon customer, Vicente, who accepts her deal. The Americans -- an ex-sheriff, a gambler, and an upstart-kid bounty hunter -- sign on as well. 

During the harrowing journey inland, Leah informs ex-lawman Hooker that the site where her husband is trapped was once a boom town, but wiped out by a volcanic eruption, leaving only a church steeple and a gold mine still uncovered by lava. The resident priest called it the "garden of evil." The Indians now consider the volcano sacred. When the group arrives at the mine, they discover John unconscious but alive. They work to free him before the ceiling collapses further, then transport him to a nearby cabin where Hooker sets his broken leg.

With hostile Apaches nearby, the group quickly prepares to leave, but during the return journey, the bounty hunter is killed by an arrow in the back. At a burnt-out mission, Leah's husband is found dead, hung upside down on a cross. Vicente falls next, the victim of multiple arrows. Later, the three survivors reach a choke point in the cliff-hugging path, the only way out. Hooker and the gambler, Fiske, draw cards to see which of them will stay behind to hold off the Indians while the other rides with Leah to safety. Fiske "wins" and succeeds in killing or driving off most of their pursuers before he is mortally wounded. After seeing that Leah is safe, Hooker returns to aid a dying Fiske, who admits he cheated on the card draw to guarantee he would stay behind. Fiske urges Hooker to settle down with Leah. Hooker returns to Leah, and they ride off into the sunset.

Cast
 Gary Cooper as Hooker 
 Susan Hayward as Leah Fuller 
 Richard Widmark as Fiske 
 Hugh Marlowe as John Fuller 
 Cameron Mitchell as Luke Daly 
 Rita Moreno as Cantina singer
 Víctor Manuel Mendoza as Vicente Madariaga

Production
The working title for the film was Volcano, it was changed because "there is an Italian pic of same title now playing U.S. art houses", a 1950 film directed by William Dieterle and starring Rossano Brazzi and Anna Magnani.

Robert L. Jacks was originally set to produce, but he left 20th Century-Fox to join Panoramic Productions and was replaced by Charles Brackett.

Outdoor sequences were shot on location in Mexico, at "the colonial town" of Tepotzotlán, in the jungle areas near Acapulco, Parícutin volcano with the church ruin of Nuevo San Juan Parangaricutiro, and the village of Guanajuato with the then-unrestored church ruins of Templo Santiago Apóstol, Marfil. Interior scenes were also shot at the Churubusco Studios in Mexico City.

Reception
The New York Times reviewer wrote, "Although the story and its fireworks are interesting, they are dwarfed by the rugged mountains and lush coconut and banana-tree jungles of the film's natural settings."

In his 1988 book, The American West in Film: Critical Approaches to the Western, author Jon Tuska observed the American characters in Garden of Evil are "stalked on the way to the mine by Apaches wearing Mohawk hairpieces." Tuska was referencing one of the filmmakers' gaffes—dressing Apache tribe members as Mohawks. According to author Josephine Paterek, Apaches generally "wore the hair long and flowing or in two braids." This was sometimes augmented with a war cap consisting of "fur and curved antelope horns." Mohawk and Iroquois tribes, those located in the northeastern U. S., almost exclusively, "shaved off all the hair except for the scalplock at the back", adorned with "a roach spreader of bone holding erect a feather that rotated freely..." Mohawk hairstyles, however, were virtually nonexistent among Native-Americans in the Southwest.

See also
 List of American films of 1954

References

External links
 
 
 

1954 films
1954 Western (genre) films
American Western (genre) films
Films scored by Bernard Herrmann
Films directed by Henry Hathaway
Films produced by Charles Brackett
Films set in Mexico
Films about mining
20th Century Fox films
CinemaScope films
1950s English-language films
1950s American films